Wilfred Jones, CMG, OBE  (29 November 1926 – 30 January 2018) was a British diplomat who served as the High Commissioner to Botswana from 1981 to 1986.

Jones joined the Foreign Office in 1949. From 1950 to 1966 he served in Tamsui, Jedda, Brussels and Athens. He was then First Secretary at Canberra , Copenhagen, Blantyre and  Lilongwe. He was at the FCO from 1977 to 1981.

References

1926 births
2018 deaths
Companions of the Order of St Michael and St George
High Commissioners of the United Kingdom to Botswana